The Australia national under-17 soccer team represents Australia in men's international under-17 soccer. The team is controlled by the governing body for Football in Australia, Football Federation Australia (FFA), which is currently a member of the Asian Football Confederation (AFC) and the regional ASEAN Football Federation (AFF) since leaving the Oceania Football Confederation (OFC) in 2006. The team's official nickname is the Joeys.

Australia is a ten-time OFC champion and a two-time AFF champion. The team has represented Australia at the FIFA U-17 World Cup tournaments on twelve occasions.

History

1999 U-17 World Championship
The Joeys best result in international football came in the 1999 FIFA U-17 World Championship hosted by New Zealand, where Australia finished second. 

To qualify for the tournament Australia had to first win the Oceania qualifiers. This was achieved with wins over Fiji, Papua New Guinea, Cook Islands, American Samoa, Vanuatu, New Caledonia and again Fiji in the final which finished 5–0. Next up was a two leg play-off against Bahrain who had finished third in the 1998 AFC U-17 Championship. Australia won 3–1 on aggregate. 

In the tournament proper, Australia lost their opening game 2–1 to Brazil although a come from behind 2–1 win over Germany and a 1–0 win over Mali saw Australia top the group. Australia dispatched of Qatar 1–0 in the quarter final and needed penalties to get past USA after a 2–2 draw in the semi-final. They lost the final to Brazil; the match finished nil all after extra time and Brazil won a penalty shoot-out 8–7. 

A number of this Joeys squad would go on to represent the Socceroos including Adrian Madaschi, Jade North, Joshua Kennedy and Scott McDonald.

Coaching staff

 Coach:   Brad Maloney
 Assistant coach:  Michael Cooper
 Goalkeeper coach:  Davide Del Giovine
 Technical consultant:  Ron Smith

Players

Current squad
The following 24 players were called up for U-17 Antalya Youth Cup from 10 to 15 February.

Caps and goals correct as of the 2023 AFC U-17 Asian Cup qualification game against Morocco on 13 February, 2023.

Recent call-ups
The following players have been called up within the last 12 months and remain eligible for selection.

Recent results and fixtures

2022

2023

Competitive record

FIFA U-17 World Cup

OFC U-17 Championship

AFC U-17 Asian Cup

AFF U-16 Youth Championship

Honours
 FIFA U-17 World Cup
Runners-up (1): 1999

 OFC U-17 Championship
Champions (10): 1983, 1987, 1989, 1991, 1993, 1995, 1999, 2001, 2003, 2005
Runners-up (1): 1997

 AFF U-16 Championship
Champions (2): 2008, 2016
Runners-up (1): 2012
Third place (3): 2013, 2015, 2017

References

External links

Oz Football Joeys Archive

Asian national under-17 association football teams
National youth sports teams of Australia